The Stegner Fellowship program is a two-year creative writing fellowship at Stanford University. The award is named after American Wallace Stegner (1909–1993), a historian, novelist, short story writer, environmentalist, and Stanford faculty member who founded the university's creative writing program.

Ten fellowships are awarded every year, five in fiction and five in poetry. The recipients do not need a degree to receive the fellowships, though many fellows already hold the terminal M.F.A. degree in creative writing. A workshop-based program, no degree is awarded after the two-year fellowship. Prior to 1990, many fellows also enrolled in Stanford's now-defunct M.A. program in creative writing.

Fellows receive a stipend of $43,000 per year, as well as health insurance and their tuition fee for Stanford. Fellows are required to live close enough to Stanford to be able to attend all workshops, as well as other department-related readings and events.

History
Stegner founded the Stanford creative writing department and fellowship program in 1946. Initial funding was supplied by Dr. E. H. Jones, brother of the chair of the Stanford English Department, Richard Foster Jones. Initially the fellowship was for three writing fellows per year, many of whom were World War II veterans returning home from overseas. In 1973, then-director John L'Heureux expanded the program to include eight fiction writers and eight poets per year. In 1992, the program expanded again to ten fiction writers and ten poets each year.

Faculty
The current poetry faculty for the program consists of Louise Gluck, A. Van Jordan, and Patrick Phillips. The current fiction faculty for the program consists of Elizabeth Tallent, Adam Johnson and Chang-Rae Lee. Other notable writers often serve as guest instructors for a quarter as part of other endowed lectureships. Recent visiting writers include Heather McHugh, Nobel Laureate J. M. Coetzee, Bharati Mukherjee, Robert Pinsky, Colm Toibin, Li-Young Lee and, just before his death in 2004, Thom Gunn. Notable previous long-term faculty include W. S. Di Piero and Denise Levertov in poetry; and John L'Heureux and Nancy Packer in fiction.

Notable Stegner Fellows

 Edward Abbey
 Gregory Abbott
 Adedayo Agarau
 Molly Antopol
 James Arthur
 Talvikki Ansel
 Ken Babbs
 Tom Barbash
 Peter S. Beagle
 Frank Bergon
 Wendell Berry
 Jamel Brinkley
 David Biespiel
 Edgar Bowers
 Geoffrey Brock
 Jason Brown
 NoViolet Bulawayo
 Bo Caldwell
 Raymond Carver
 Samantha Chang
 Marilyn Chin
 Eddie Chuculate
 Evan Connell
 Max Crawford
 Alison Hawthorne Deming
 Donald Davie
 Catherine Davis
  Stephen Dixon
 Harriet Doerr
 Geri Doran
 Safia Elhillo
 Stephen Elliott
 Eugene England
 Peter Everwine
 Ernest Gaines
 Allan Gurganus
 Merrill Joan Gerber
 Reginald Gibbons
 Charles Gullans
 Thom Gunn
 James Baker Hall
 Ron Hansen
 Vicki Hearne
 William Hjortsberg
 Alice Hoffman
 Skip Horack
 James D. Houston
 Maria Hummel
 Scott Hutchins
 Adam Johnson
 Donald Justice
 Christopher Kempf
 Ken Kesey
 Suji Kwock Kim
 Chuck Kinder
 H. T. Kirby-Smith
 William Kittredge
 Dana Kletter
 Philip Levine
 Anthony Marra
 Tom W. Mayer
 Ed McClanahan
 Michael McGriff
 Thomas McGuane
 James McMichael
 Larry McMurtry
 Joanne Meschery
 Robert Mezey
 Ottessa Moshfegh
 Gurney Norman
Jenny Offill
 Raymond Oliver
 Tillie Olsen
 Julie Orringer
 Nancy Packer
 ZZ Packer
 Charlotte Painter
 Robert Pinsky
 Eric Puchner
 Stephen Ratcliffe
 Chip Rawlins
 Rita Mae Reese
 Peter Rock
 David Roderick
 William Pitt Root
 Benjamin Alire Sáenz
 Keith Scribner
 Vikram Seth
 Alan Shapiro
 Solmaz Sharif
 Akhil Sharma
 Maggie Shipstead
 Tracy K. Smith
 Timothy Steele
 Alan Stephens
 Robert Stone
 Rod Taylor
 Lysley Tenorio
 Justin Torres
 Scott Turow
 Kirstin Valdez Quade
 Robert Vasquez
 Emily Warn
 Jesmyn Ward
 Christian Wiman
 Sari Wilson
 Tobias Wolff
 Mark Wunderlich
 David Yezzi
 Monica Youn
 Al Young
 Kevin Young
 David Vann

References

External links
 

Stanford University
American literary awards
American poetry awards
San Francisco Bay Area literature